= Mannargudi coalfield =

Coal field in Tamil Nadu, India

- Location: Tamil Nadu, India
- Products: Coal

The Mannargudi is a large coal field located in the south of India in Tamil Nadu. Mannargudi represents one of the largest coal reserves in India, having estimated reserves of 2,037 crore tonnes of coal.
